The Buckhorn Presbyterian Church (also known as the Buckhorn Lake Area Church) and the Greer Gymnasium are two historic log buildings located off KY 28 in Buckhorn, Kentucky. The church and the gymnasium, completed in 1928 and 1927 respectively, are the only two surviving buildings from Witherspoon College, a Buckhorn school which served grades 1–12. Presbyterian minister Harvey Murdoch established the church and school in 1902 in response to southeastern Kentucky's lack of educational facilities and permanent churches at the time. Both institutions grew rapidly; the school had 369 students by 1914, and when the new church building was constructed, the 865-member congregation was the largest rural Presbyterian church in Kentucky. The church and gymnasium were the last two buildings constructed for the college; the older buildings have since been lost to fire or demolition.

The buildings were added to the National Register in 1975.

See also
National Register of Historic Places listings in Kentucky

References

External links
Buckhorn Lake Church

Presbyterian churches in Kentucky
Churches on the National Register of Historic Places in Kentucky
Churches completed in 1928
20th-century Presbyterian church buildings in the United States
National Register of Historic Places in Perry County, Kentucky
Gyms in the United States
1927 establishments in Kentucky
1928 establishments in Kentucky
University and college buildings completed in 1927
Education in Perry County, Kentucky
University and college buildings on the National Register of Historic Places in Kentucky
Scandinavian architecture